The Sooner Catholic is a bi-monthly newspaper (except in July and December) published by the Archdiocese of Oklahoma City. (The Sooner Catholic Online is the web-based version of the newspaper.) There is no subscription charge for Catholics in Oklahoma who request the newspaper; a subscription rate of $20 a year is requested for those persons who are not members of the Archdiocese of Oklahoma City. The current publisher of the newspaper is Paul Stagg Coakley, archbishop of Oklahoma City.

See also
Eastern Oklahoma Catholic (newspaper of the Diocese of Tulsa)

References

External links
Home page. Sooner Catholic Online

Roman Catholic Archdiocese of Oklahoma City
Catholic newspapers published in the United States
Newspapers published in Oklahoma City
Catholic Church in Oklahoma